is a Japanese manga series written and illustrated by Emi Ishikawa, and had been published in Shueisha's Ribon magazine from 2008 to 2015. The format was a collection of horror-themed short stories that were presented by a ghost girl named Yomi. It has been adapted in France by Tonkam. In 2010, the series was given a "vomic" (voiceover comic) that starred Tomomi Kasai, Moeno Nitō, Haruka Ishida, and Reina Fujie, who are members of the Japanese idol group AKB48. It was adapted into a live action film that was released on June 14, 2013.

Live-action Cast
 Haruna Kawaguchi as Kana Araki
 Alice Hirose as Rio Takamizawa
 Mayu Matsuoka as Erika Katori
 Haru as Makoto Hosaka
 Mizuki Yamamoto as Yomi
 Louis Kurihara as Akira Gotō

Reception
It won the award for best Children's manga at the 59th Shogakukan Manga Awards.

References

External links
 

Horror anime and manga
Live-action films based on manga
Manga adapted into films
Shueisha franchises
Shueisha manga
Shōjo manga
Winners of the Shogakukan Manga Award for children's manga
Japanese horror films